Jorge Mendoza Garza (born 1 September 1951) is a Mexican politician affiliated with the PRI. As of 2013 he served as Deputy of the LXII Legislature of the Mexican Congress representing Nuevo León. He also served as Senator during the LX and LXI Legislatures.

References

1951 births
Living people
Politicians from Monterrey
Members of the Senate of the Republic (Mexico)
Members of the Chamber of Deputies (Mexico)
Institutional Revolutionary Party politicians
21st-century Mexican politicians